The following is a list of Belarusian-language poets.

Maksim Bahdanovič
Zmitrok Biadula (real name Shmuel Plavnik)
Kastuś Kalinoŭski
Hienadz Kliauko
Jakub Kołas (real name Kanstancy Mickievič)
Janka Kupała (real name Ivan Łucevič)
Vintsent Dunin-Martsinkyevich
Valzhyna Mort
Ales Prudnikau (real name Alyaksandr Prudnikau)
Pavel Prudnikau

Belarusian